Hugi is one of the longest lasting, frequently released demoscene and underground disk magazines (diskmag) for IBM-PC.

History 

The first issues were in German language and were released in 1996. From issue 11 on the magazine issued in German and English. With issue 18 the German part became a separate magazine called Hugi.GER. Moreover, in the years 1998 to 2000 there was a weekly newsletter which continued the tradition of similar publications such as Demonews.

Hugi developed from a kind of electronic school magazine to one of the most successful  and long-living demoscene and underground magazines. The contents are mainly based on contributions from the readers and only proofread and formatted by the editors. Topics include graphics, demos, demoparties, programming, other diskmags, reports, politics and literature. Each issue also features graphics and background music.

Articles from Hugi have been cited in all three doctoral theses about the demoscene that have been published in the years 2011 to 2017.  The book Hacking Europe - From Computer Cultures to Demoscenes, from 2014, mentions Hugi as well in one of its chapters.

Issues 

38 issues were released until June 2014, 17 of which were partially or completely in German. 12 issues were also translated to the Russian language. Moreover, five issues of the German language offspring Hugi.GER, 38 newsletters and 4 special editions (Coding Digest, Hugibox music disk, Interview Bonanza and Special Edition #4) were released. The main editor of 
Hugi, Claus D. Volko (Vienna, Austria), is also known as “Adok” in the demoscene. 

Hugi was one of the first diskmags that was released as a Windows executable (September 1998). Moreover, it was a dual DOS and Windows diskmag for 6 issues (September 1998 to August 1999). Both facts were strongly notable at this time and caused a lot of discussion.  The magazine uses the engine "Panorama", which was created for Hugi by the Polish programmer Chris Dragan. Many other electronical magazines are nowadays also based on it.

Criticism 
Hugi has attracted a large amount of controversy itself roughly after its 26th issue; many sceners complained that a large portion of articles were uninteresting and not related to the demoscene itself. This problem was further emphasized by the fact that Hugi editors were accused by spamming demoscene forums by requests for articles, even though a considerable portion of the scene had denounced Hugi by this time. Interest has been since rekindled for the latest issues, as the editor crew has announced to apply more intense quality control over their articles.

The 30th issue of Hugi was a subject of confusion when it appeared that the 'demoscene' section of the magazine could only be accessed through a self-confessed 'IQ-test'. The test was viewed by most demoscener readers as gratuitous and not serving any practical purpose, especially because it was relatively easily bypassable with e.g. trial and error.

The 35th issue of Hugi raised a yet unseen backlash, when it was discovered that the mag contained an article opposing immigration to Europe from Islamic and African countries because of the immigrants' religion and their allegedly low IQ. While the article was removed within 6 hours, questions were raised whether the article slipped through quality control (the scenario supported by the editors, but considered preposterous by the readers), was included because of simply of the yellow journalistic value, or whether main editor Adok simply included the article because he agreed with the content, after he initially did not apologize or comment on the issue. The article was later revealed by the author to be a complete ruse - a copy-paste from Wikipedia and a text written by a Finnish philologist, aimed to test whether the article of such content could get in the final magazine. The diskmag was near-universally condemned, amid additional accusations of "jumping the bandwagon" started by diskmag ZINE of having a "headlines" demo to increase anticipation, copying ZINE's unique 3-by-2 thumbnailed layout and "roundtable" interviews.

The 36th issue of Hugi, from April 2010, garnered mostly positive feedback.

Hugi Size Coding Competition 

The Hugi staff also hosts a popular series of online Assembler programming and size-optimizing contests called “Hugi Size Coding Competition”. The objective is to implement a given program using as little space as possible. This results in executable files with a size of far less than one kilobyte. Since 1998, 29 competitions have been held so far. The number of participants per contest is usually 20 - 80. Participants come from virtually all over the world (North America, Europe, East Asia, South Africa, Australia,...). Every contestant gets points depending on the size of their entry. After each competition, the entries are released together with source codes, and a discussion in a mailing list occurs in which objections regarding the validity of the entries can be made. The authors of invalid entries will get penalty. Once a year, a "world league table" is generated in which the points from all contests held in that year have been added together.

References

External links 
  - Hugi Magazine
 Official Website - Hugi Size Coding Competition
 Hugi on :fr:Pouët
 Hugi on scene.org

Demoscene
Disk magazines
Magazines established in 1996
German-language magazines
Music magazines published in Germany